Mount Amchad is a mountain in Errachidia Province, Morocco. It is located in the Atlas Mountains near the village of Asemmam.

References

Mountains of Morocco
Geography of Drâa-Tafilalet